The domain name .travel is a top-level domain in the Domain Name System of the Internet. .travel domain names are available to individuals and / or organizations who provides or plans to provide services, products or content in or to the travel industry. It is sponsored by Donuts Inc., and registrations are processed via accredited registrars.

History
The domain was approved by ICANN on April 8, 2005 as a sponsored TLD in the second group of new TLD applications evaluated in 2004. TheGlobe.com acquired Tralliance Corporation, the operator of .travel, on May 9, 2005. In 2018, Donuts acquired the .travel TLD. Information about this TLD, and other travel-related top-level domains in the Donuts portfolio, can be found at https://travel.domains

The official launch began in October 2005, with a screening process to determine eligibility to register domains in each of three monthly groups for October, November and December. Open registrations began in January 2006. Governments were given priority registration for geographic place names from July 2005 to December 21, 2007.

By 2017, there were approximately eighteen thousand .travel domains registered.

Purpose
Registration is open to organizations, associations, and private, governmental and non-governmental agencies, or people who provides or plan to provide services, products or content in or to the travel industry.

See also
 Travel 2.0

References

External links
 

Sponsored top-level domains
Travel technology
Computer-related introductions in 2005

sv:Toppdomän#Generiska toppdomäner